Contents: List of Registered Historic Places in Lincoln County, Nevada, USA:

The locations of National Register properties and districts (at least for all showing latitude and longitude coordinates below), may be seen in an online map by clicking on "Map of all coordinates".

Current listings 

|}

See also

 List of National Historic Landmarks in Nevada
 National Register of Historic Places listings in Nevada

References

 
Lincoln